The North Eye is an under-construction residential skyscraper in Noida, National Capital Region, India. It is expected to be the tallest residential building in North India. The tower will have 66 floors upon completion. As of April 2018, the 46th Floor Roof Slab casting has been completed.

References

Buildings and structures in Delhi
Buildings and structures in Noida